Pitcairnia × daiseyana is a natural hybrid of P. heterophylla and P. pungens. This plant is endemic to Ecuador.

References

daiseyana
Interspecific plant hybrids
Endemic flora of Ecuador